The 2015 Dally M Awards were presented on Monday 28 September 2015 at Sydney's Star Casino and was broadcast on Fox Sports. They are the official annual awards of the National Rugby League and are named after Dally Messenger. Halfback Johnathan Thurston won the Dally M Medal with a record margin of 11 votes, overtaking Andrew Johns in becoming the first player to claim the award for the fourth time.

Judges

Dally M Medal

Dally M Awards
The Dally M Awards are, as usual, conducted at the close of the regular season and hence do not take games played in the finals series into account. The Dally M Medal is for the official player of the year while the Provan-Summons Medal is for the fans' of "people's choice" player of the year.

Team of the Year

Presenters
 Matthew Johns
 Tony Squires

See also
Dally M Awards
Dally M Medal
2015 NRL season

References

Dally M Awards
Dally M Awards
2015